Quonset may refer to:

Places
 Quonset Point, a peninsula in North Kingstown, Rhode Island 
 Naval Air Station Quonset Point
 Quonset State Airport
 Rhode Island Route 403, signed as Quonset Freeway
 Quonset Glacier, a glacier in Antarctica

Other uses
 Quonset hut, a military structure
 Quonset Hut Studio, a former recording studio in Nashville, Tennessee